Guess What is a Canadian game show that aired from 1983 to 1987. The show was created by Nick Nicholson and E. Roger Muir, the pair behind The Newlywed Game and a series of long-running Canadian productions such as Definition, and was a production of Glen-Warren Productions for CTV. Robin Ward served as the host while Nick Hollinrake announced.

Guess What originally was taped at CFCF-TV in Montreal, CTV's owned-and-operated station in the largest city in Quebec, with production later moving to CFTO-TV, CTV's Toronto-based flagship at Glen Warren Studios in Scarborough.

Main game
Guess What was played between two family teams with three players on each side. One was usually a returning champion.

Multiple Choice Questions
In each round, host Ward read a series of three questions, each with six possible answers displayed on the show's gameboard. Only one of these was correct, and control alternated between the teams one player at a time until someone guessed the correct answer. The value of each question started at 60 points, with 10 being deducted for each wrong guess. Some of the questions featured audio or visual content.

Team Effort Question
Each round ended with a special question called the "Team Effort Question". These questions were simple multiple-choice questions, with A, B, C, or D as the choices. However, each team member chose an answer individually and the team was not allowed to converse prior to or after choosing an answer. To choose an answer, each player opened a compartment in the podium in front of them and picked a small sign with the corresponding letter on it to indicate their selection. After everyone had chosen an answer, Ward then asked for their answers one at a time moving from left to right.

If all three team members gave different answers and one was correct, the team received 20 points. If two of them agreed on the right answer, they received 50 points. If all three team members answered correctly, 100 points were awarded. A Team Effort Question also served as the final question of the day, and that question was played for a maximum of 300 points with 100 given for each correct answer. The team in the lead after the final Team Effort Question won the game and a small collection of prizes, and advanced to the bonus game for a chance to win more.

Bonus round
In the bonus round, the winning family were asked three more questions with four possible answers on the first question, five on the second, and six on the third. Each question was worth  and if the first two questions were answered correctly, the last question was worth a bonus prize; otherwise, it was played for an additional .

Any family that remained champions for five consecutive episodes, later seven, won a grand prize.

CTV Television Network original programming
1983 Canadian television series debuts
1987 Canadian television series endings
Television series by Nicholson-Muir Productions
Television series by Glen-Warren Productions
Television series by Bell Media
Television shows filmed in Montreal
Television shows filmed in Toronto
1980s Canadian game shows